"She's Got Issues" is a song by The Offspring. It is the seventh track on their fifth studio album Americana (1998) and was released as the fourth and final single on October 19, 1999. The song also appears as the third track on the EP A Piece of Americana (1998).

The lyrics to the song have a narrator calling out on his angsty, victim-playing girlfriend. As singer Dexter Holland described, "Today everyone has issues and no one takes responsibility because their mother or their father drank too much or whatever". The title is inspired by the "typical psychobabble" present in talk shows.

Track listing

Version 1

Version 2/UK CD1

Version 3/UK CD2

Music video
The video, directed by Jonathan Dayton and Valerie Faris and animated by Wayne White, shows a usual workday of a young adult woman (played by a pre-fame Zooey Deschanel), and the things in her everyday life that she finds disturbing or annoying, are enhanced by grotesque cartoons, which represent her imagination. On the Making the Video episode for "She's Got Issues", Dexter Holland described it as an "anti-video" for its highly conceptual nature.

The woman is first shown sleeping in her bed. She wakes up and fries two eggs for breakfast. After watching TV while eating, she changes into her clothes and goes downstairs. She then takes the subway to work. She works at a photo printing shop and is caught by her boss stealing a photo gets fired after an argument. She consults her psychiatrist about her issues. She then runs back to her apartment and is welcomed by the band playing there.

DVD appearances
The music video also appears on their video collection Complete Music Video Collection, which was released in 2005.

Charts

References

External links

The Offspring songs
1999 singles
Songs written by Dexter Holland
Music videos directed by Jonathan Dayton and Valerie Faris
1998 songs
Columbia Records singles